The term "debellatio" or "debellation" (Latin "defeating, or the act of conquering or subduing", literally, "warring (the enemy) down", from Latin bellum "war") designates the end of war caused by complete destruction of a hostile state. Israeli law-school professor Eyal Benvenisti defines it as "a situation in which a party to a conflict has been totally defeated in war, its national institutions have disintegrated, and none of its allies continue to challenge the enemy militarily on its behalf".

Examples

Carthage 
In some cases debellation ends with a complete dissolution and annexation of the defeated state into the victor's national territory, as happened at the end of the Third Punic War with the defeat of Carthage by Rome in the 2nd century BC.

Nazi Germany
The unconditional surrender of the Third Reich, in the strict sense only the German Armed Forces, at the end of World War II was at the time accepted by most authorities as a case of debellatio as:
 There was a complete dissolution of the German Reich, including all offices. 
 The Allied Control Council held sovereignty over the territory of Germany.
 Much of the territory of the German Reich was annexed (see former eastern territories of Germany)
 No unitary German state remained, the German Reich being succeeded by the Federal Republic of Germany and the German Democratic Republic. 

Other authorities, supported in the judgements of the German Federal Constitutional Court, have argued that a German state remained in existence from 1945 to 1949, albeit dormant and without any institutional or organisational component, on the basis that: 
 Most of the territory that made up Germany before the Anschluss was not annexed.
 A German population still existed and was recognised as having German nationality. 
 German institutions such as courts never ceased to exist even though the Allied Control Council governed the territory.
 Eventually, a German government regained full sovereignty over all German territory that had not been annexed (see German reunification).
 The Federal Republic of Germany sees itself as the legal continuation of the German Reich.

The official position of the allied occupied government as well all subsequent German governments since, has been and remains that the Nazi regime was "illegal"; with laws and verdicts imposed during the Third Reich regularly being declared facially invalid. The allies did not consider the German people and the Nazis indistinguishable, rather the opposite.

 Following the surrender, the Nazi party was and remains to this day outlawed; various restrictions were imposed on former Nazi party members including bans on running for or holding public office, though these laws were later scaled back. Following the end of the allied occupation, West Germany assumed a certain degree of responsibility for the atrocities committed by Nazi Germany and agreed to make major reparation payments to its victims.

Others
 Republic of Venice. See Fall of the Republic of Venice.
 Confederate States of America. See Conclusion of the American Civil War.
 Austria-Hungary. See Treaty of Trianon and Treaty of Saint Germain.
 South Vietnam. See Fall of Saigon

See also
Disarmed Enemy Forces
Laws of war
Legal status of Germany
Total war
War termination

References

Further reading
 
 
 
 ICRC Commentary on Protocol Additional to the Geneva Conventions of 12 August 1949, and relating to the Protection of Victims of International Armed Conflicts (Protocol I), 8 June 1977. Commenting on the term "The general close of military operations" in Article 3.b  of Protocol I the ICRC states in their commentary in footnote 5 "Some of the literature refers to this situation ['The general close of military operations' when the occupation of the whole territory of a Party is completed, accompanied by the effective cessation of all hostilities, without the necessity of a legal instrument of any kind] as 'debellatio', but this is a narrower interpretation of the term than other publicists ascribe to it. On the concept of 'debellatio' and the various definitions of this term, cf. K.U. Meyn, 'Debellatio', in R. Bernhardt (ed.) [Encyclopaedia of Public International Law], Instalment 3, p. 145;"

External links
 

International law
Law of war
Latin legal terminology
Latin political words and phrases